Janq'u Jaqhi (Aymara janq'u white, jaqhi precipice, cliff, "white cliff", also spelled Jankho Jakke) is a  mountain in the Chilla-Kimsa Chata mountain range in the Andes of Bolivia. It is situated in the La Paz Department, Ingavi Province, Desaguadero Municipality. Janq'u Jaqhi lies south of Wiñaymarka Lake, the southern branch of Lake Titicaca.

References 

Mountains of La Paz Department (Bolivia)